Sterling is an unincorporated community in Skagit County, in the U.S. state of Washington.

History
The Mesekwegwils (sometimes transliterated as Mee-see-qua-guilch or buh-see-kwee-GWEELTS), a band of the Skagit people, built a large winter longhouse at what is now Sterling. The Lushootseed name for Sterling, as well as the prior village site, is sxʷiʔxʷičəb.

Sterling was laid out in 1878. A post office called Sterling was established in 1879, and remained in operation until 1890.

References

Unincorporated communities in Skagit County, Washington
Unincorporated communities in Washington (state)